Pravda is a satirical play by David Hare and Howard Brenton exploring the role of journalism in society.  It was first produced at the National Theatre in London on 2 May 1985, directed by Hare and starring Anthony Hopkins in the role of Lambert Le Roux, white South African media mogul.  It is a satire on the mid-1980s newspaper industry, in particular the Australian media and press baron Rupert Murdoch. Its title refers to the Russian Communist party newspaper Pravda.

The play won 1985 Best Play Award from both the London Evening Standard Awards and City Limits magazine. It has been described as "one of the biggest hits in the history of the National Theatre."

Original cast

Andrew May - Tim McInnerny
Bill Smiley - Richard Hope
Bishop of Putney - Daniel Thorndike
Cartoonist - William Sleigh
Cliveden Whicker-Baskett - Guy Williams
D P P Payne - Christopher Baines
Donna Le Roux - Zoe Rutland
Eaton Sylvester - Bill Nighy
Elliot Fruit-Norton - Basil Henson
Hamish McLennan; Hannon Spot - Fred Pearson
Harry Morrison - Ron Pember
Jack ‘Breaker’ Bond - Bill Moody
Journalist - Robert Ralph
Journalist - Paul Stewart
Lambert Le Roux - Anthony Hopkins
Larry Punt - Mark Jax
Leander Scroop - Nigel Le Vaillant
Lord Silk; Ian Ape-Warden - Olivier Pierre
Michael Quince M.P. - Peter Blythe
Miles Foley; Mac ‘Whipper’ Wellington; *Doug Fantom - Ian Bartholomew
Moira Patterson - Patricia Franklin
Newsvendor - Glenn Williams
Photographer - Desmond Adams
Princess Jill - Harriet Thorpe
Rebecca Foley - Kate Buffery
Sir Stamford Foley - Ivor Roberts
Suzie Fontaine - Miranda Foster
Waiter - Norman Warwick

Critical reception
Punch called it "A savagely bitchy and often wildly funny evening"; the Financial Times noted "A magnificent epic drama"; and The Observer wrote of "sulphorous and crackling entertainment."

References

External links
Literary Encyclopaedia
Chicago Tribune review of production in 2005
Study Guide for Play by Timeline Theater, Chicago IL USA
https://www.hitpages.com/doc/6307672185896960/10/

1985 plays
Plays by David Hare
Plays by Howard Brenton